Bathelium mirabile is a species of corticolous (bark-dwelling) lichen in the family Trypetheliaceae. Found in Bolivia, it was formally described as a new species in 2016 by lichenologists Adam Flakus, Martin Kukwa, and André Aptroot. It is only known to occur in this and similar habitats in Bolivia. The species epithet mirabile makes reference to the "unusual combination of pigments in the pseudostromata".

References

Trypetheliaceae
Lichen species
Lichens described in 2016
Lichens of Bolivia
Taxa named by André Aptroot
Taxa named by Adam Grzegorz Flakus